The Murray Mallee is the grain-growing and sheep-farming area of South Australia bounded to the north and west by the Murray River (in South Australia, "River Murray"),  to the east by the Victorian border, and extending about 50 km south of the Mallee Highway.

The Murray Mallee area is predominantly a vast plain of low elevation, with sandhills and gentle undulating sandy rises, interspersed by flats. The annual rainfall ranges from approximately 250 mm in the north to 400 mm further south. The area was very lightly populated up until the beginning of the 20th century, with marginal pastoral runs of sheep at low stocking rates. Artesian water was discovered at moderate depth, and railways opened to make shipping of grain feasible. The first railway was the Pinnaroo line in 1906 from Tailem Bend on the main Melbourne–Adelaide railway. The success of this line led to construction further north of the Brown's Well railway line in 1913, and before that line had been completed, the government approved a number of spur lines from it. These included the Peebinga railway line into the land between the new line and the Pinnaroo line, extending the Brown's Well line north to Paringa, and spurs to Loxton and Waikerie. Another spur, the Moorook railway line opened in 1925. All of these have now closed due to the declining use of railways for grain transport in the area.

The main towns in the mallee are Karoonda, Lameroo and Pinnaroo. Towns along the Murray are generally considered to be in the Riverland or Murraylands, rather than the Mallee.

Originally the Mallee was covered in thick mallee scrub. Large expanses (estimates are around 80%) of the mallee were cleared for agricultural development, beginning as early as the 1880s. Most of the remaining natural vegetation is in  protected areas such as Ngarkat Conservation Park, Billiatt Conservation Park,  Karte Conservation Park, Peebinga Conservation Park, Bakara Conservation Park and Lowan Conservation Park.

Notes

References

External links

Murray Mallee Strategic Task Force
Catchment Management Board

 
IBRA subregions